Behavior theory can refer to:

 The collective behavior theory, in sociology,  the social processes and events which do not reflect existing social structure, but which emerge in a "spontaneous" way.
 The theories of political behavior, in political science, an attempt to quantify and explain the influences that define a person's political views, ideology, and levels of political participation
 The theory of planned behavior, in psychology, refers to attitude toward behavior, subjective norms, and perceived behavioral control, together shape an individual's behavioral intentions and behaviors
learning theory, in education, describing how information is absorbed, processed, and retained during learning
behaviorism, in psychology, maintains that behaviors can be described scientifically without recourse either to internal physiological events or to hypothetical constructs such as thoughts and beliefs